Kreischer House, also known as Kreischer Mansion, is a historic home located at Charleston, Staten Island, New York City.  Built by German immigrant Balthasar Kreischer about 1885, it is a large, asymmetrically massed -story, wood-frame house in the American Queen Anne style.  The rectangular house features spacious verandas, gables with jigsaw bargeboards, decorative railings, posts and brackets, tall chimneys, and a corner tower.  It was one of two mansions built by Kreischer for his sons.  The surviving house belonged to son Edward Kreischer; the other one had been his brother Charles's. It was added to the National Register of Historic Places in 1982.

History
On June 8, 1894, Edward B. Kreischer committed suicide by shooting himself in the right temple near his place of business. Since then, there have been claims that Kreischer has haunted the property. Along with other local stories of the house's violent history, this has given the house a supernatural reputation, leading it to be used as a location on television shows including Boardwalk Empire.

In 1998 the Kreischer Mansion was bought with the intention of restoration and eventual sale by Isaac Yomtovian. In 2008, then caretaker Joseph "Joe Black" Young was revealed to be a hitman for the Bonanno crime family, more specifically serving under Bonanno Soldier Gino Galestro. He was convicted of the murder of rival mob associate Robert McKelvey, committed three years earlier on the property.

Reputed hauntings 
The house is reputedly haunted. In 2019, paranormal investigators from American television series Paranormal Lockdown visited the house; the resulting investigations became an episode of the show's first season.

See also
 List of New York City Designated Landmarks in Staten Island
 National Register of Historic Places listings in Richmond County, New York

References

External links
 Spirits Moving on S.I.
 The Kreischer Mansion

Houses on the National Register of Historic Places in Staten Island
Victorian architecture in New York (state)
Houses completed in 1885
New York City Designated Landmarks in Staten Island